Somatina ctenophora is a moth of the  family Geometridae. It is found in Kenya, Namibia and South Africa.

References

Moths described in 1915
Scopulini
Moths of Africa